Gorgen Ray Aghayan (July 28, 1928 – October 10, 2011) was an American fashion designer and costume designer for the United States film industry. He won an Emmy Award and was nominated for an Academy Award for his costume design. From the early 1960s until his death in 2011, Aghayan's partner was fashion designer Bob Mackie.

Early life and education
Aghayan was born in Tehran, Iran, to a wealthy Iranian-Armenian family. Aghayan's mother, widowed when he was young, was a dressmaker for the Pahlavi family. At age 13, Aghayan assisted in designing for the court of Shah Mohammad Reza Pahlavi. His first dress design was for Fawzia Fuad of Egypt, the first wife of the last Shah of Iran. During the 1940s, Aghayan came to California as a young man.

Biography 
In the 1950s, Aghayan started working in television costuming in Los Angeles. In 1963–64, Aghayan designed dresses and costumes for Judy Garland for her musical variety show on CBS. He won an Emmy Award in 1967 with his partner Bob Mackie for his work in Alice Through the Looking Glass (1966 film). Aghayan was also nominated for an Academy Award for Best Costume Design three times for his work in Gaily, Gaily in 1970, Lady Sings the Blues in 1973 and Funny Lady in 1976. He was also responsible for designing the costumes for the opening and closing ceremonies of the 1984 Summer Olympics held in Los Angeles.

Aghayan died on October 10, 2011, at his home in Los Angeles, California of a myocardial infarction.

Personal life 
His mother joined Aghayan in California 30 years after his immigration, and just before the Iranian Revolution. Aghayan later became the lifetime partner of costume designer Bob Mackie for nearly 50 years. Early in Bob Mackie's career in the 1960s, he was Aghayan's assistant.

References

External links

 Video:  from August 26, 1998

American fashion designers
Emmy Award winners
1928 births
2011 deaths
American fashion businesspeople
LGBT fashion designers
Iranian fashion designers
Iranian LGBT artists
American LGBT people of Asian descent
Iranian emigrants to the United States
American people of Armenian descent
Businesspeople from Tehran
Iranian people of Armenian descent
American costume designers
Iranian costume designers
LGBT people from California
Armenian LGBT people